The New Jersey Legislative Council was the upper house of the New Jersey Legislature under the New Jersey Constitution of 1776 until it was replaced by the New Jersey Senate under the Constitution of 1844.

History
The Legislative Council replaced the New Jersey Provincial Council, which had been the upper house under colonial rule. The Provincial Council consisted of up to twelve members, appointed by and serving at the pleasure of the British crown. As this created an overly aristocratic and non representative body, the framers of the 1776 state constitution provided for an elected Legislative Council, with one Member of Council elected in each county for a one-year term. This structure would remain in place after 1844, when the Legislative Council would be replaced by the New Jersey Senate, and continued until 1965.

Composition
The 1776 Constitution set up a fusion of powers system of state government, which allowed for an overlap of executive, legislative and judicial authority. It provided for a bicameral legislature consisting of a General Assembly with three members from each county and a Legislative Council with one member from each county. All state officials, including the governor, were to be appointed by the Legislature under this constitution. The Vice-President of Council would succeed the Governor (who was the President of the Council) if a vacancy occurred in that office. The Governor was elected to a one-year term by the Legislative Council and the General Assembly — in joint meeting — and served, with casting vote, as the President of the Council. The Legislative Council itself chose one of its members to be Vice-President of Council who would succeed if a vacancy occurred in the Governor's office. Each county elected one member for a one-year term. Members were required to be "an inhabitant and freeholder in the county in which he is chosen, and worth at least one thousand pounds proclamation money, of real and personal estate, within the same county". Thirteen counties in 1776 increased to eighteen by 1844.

Powers
In addition to electing the Governor, the Legislative Council and the General Assembly — in joint meeting — chose the Judges of the New Jersey Supreme Court, Judges of the Inferior Court of Common Pleas, Justices of the Peace, Clerks of the Supreme Court, County Clerks, Attorney General, and Secretary of State.

Under the fusion of powers system, the Governor and Council comprised the Court of Appeals, "in the last resort", continuing the system in use under colonial rule. Three or more Members of the Legislative Council were to be a privy council to the Governor.

Under the 1776 constitution, the Legislative Council had the same powers as the Assembly in the introduction and passage of bills, with the exception that the Council could not "prepare or alter any money bill"; that authority was left to the Assembly alone. Sessions of the Legislative Council could only be convened while the Assembly was sitting. The Speaker of the Assembly was required to notify the Governor or Vice President of Council at each adjournment of the lower house of the time at which it would reconvene.

List of past vice-presidents of Council
The following is a list of past vice-presidents of the New Jersey Legislative Council from the adoption of the 1776 State Constitution.

1776-81: John Stevens, Hunterdon
 1782: John Cox, Burlington
 1783-84: Philemon Dickinson, Hunterdon
 1785-88: Robert Lettis Hooper, Jr., Hunterdon
 1789-92: Elisha Lawrence, Monmouth (acting Governor 1790)
 1793-94: Thomas Henderson, Monmouth (acting Governor 1793 & 1794)
 1795: Elisha Lawrence, Monmouth
 1796-97: James Linn, Somerset
 1798-1800: George Anderson, Burlington
 1801-04: John Lambert, Hunterdon (acting Governor 1802-03)
 1805: Thomas Little, Monmouth
 1806: George Anderson, Burlington
 1807: Ebenezer Elmer, Cumberland
 1808: Ebenezer Seeley, Cumberland
 1809: Thomas Ward, Essex
 1810-11: Charles Clark, Essex (acting Governor 1812)
 1812: James Schureman, Middlesex
 1813: Charles Clark, Essex
 1814-15: William Kennedy, Sussex (acting Governor 1815)
 1816-22: Jesse Upson, Morris
 1823-25: Peter J. Stryker, Somerset
 1826: Ephraim Bateman, Cumberland
 1827: Silas Cook, Morris
 1828: Caleb Newbold, Burlington
 1829-30: Edward Condict, Morris
 1831-32: Elias P. Seeley, Cumberland (acting Governor 1833)
 1833: Mahlon Dickerson, Morris
 1834: Jehu Patterson, Monmouth
 1835: Charles Sitgreaves, Warren
 1836: Jeptha B. Munn, Morris
 1837-38: Andrew Parsons, Passaic
 1839-40: Joseph Porter, Gloucester
 1841: John Cassedy, Bergen
 1842: William Chetwood, Essex
 1843: James Patterson, Monmouth
 (1844 elections were for the new New Jersey Senate that met in January 1845)

References

External links
The Avalon Project: New Jersey Constitution of 1776
Richard J. Connors, The Constitution of 1776
New Jersey Legislature

New Jersey Legislature
Legal history of New Jersey
1776 establishments in New Jersey
1844 disestablishments in New Jersey
Defunct upper houses